The 2012 Scotties Tournament of Hearts, the Canadian women's national curling championship, was held from Saturday, February 18 to Sunday, February 26 at the ENMAX Centrium in Red Deer, Alberta. This Tournament of Hearts marked the second time that Red Deer has hosted the Scotties; the first time that the Scotties was hosted in Red Deer was in 2004.

The winning team, Heather Nedohin of Alberta, went on to represent Canada at the 2012 Ford World Women's Curling Championship in Lethbridge, Alberta. Nedohin won the final after she defeated British Columbia's Kelly Scott with a score of 7–6. Nedohin's championship win was the seventh win by the home team of the host province and the first championship win for Alberta in fourteen years.

Teams
The defending champions, skipped by Amber Holland, returned to their third Scotties in a row, for the first time wearing the red and white for Canada. They were looking to build momentum off of last year's success, when they won their first Canadian Women's Championship. The last time a team from Saskatchewan won back to back championships was in 1994 when Team Canada's Sandra Peterson (Schmirler) defeated Manitoba's Connie Laliberte to win her second National Title.

The road to a second national title was not going to be an easy one for the defending champions, as this year's field proved to be a difficult one. For the seventh time, in eight years Kerry Galusha represented the Northwest Territories/Yukon. Galusha has added Sharon Cormier to her team, and together the team had found early success on the World Curling Tour, defeating several top teams, and qualifying for an event. Making her 10th Scotties appearance, Heather Strong represented Newfoundland and Labrador. Strong's last appearance was in 2009, when her team went 5-6. Strong has never advanced beyond a tiebreaker and was looking for a spot in the playoffs.

Manitoba's spot to the Scotties was hotly contested and had several top teams vying for the provincial title. Jennifer Jones won the provincial final over Chelsea Carey. Jones, who made her 9th appearance at the Scotties, was looking for her 5th national title, but fell short. British Columbia's provincial playoffs saw four past provincial champions looking to win a place at the Scotties. Kelly Scott defeated Marla Mallett in the final to win the provincial championship. Scott missed out on the playoffs last year. Kim Dolan represented Prince Edward Island. This was Dolan's first provincial win in 13 years, and also marked her 12th and final Scotties appearance. Nova Scotia was represented by Heather Smith-Dacey, who finished third at last year's Scotties, but failed to make the playoffs at this event.

Michelle Englot represented Saskatchewan making her 8th appearance. Her last trip to the Scotties was in 2008 and was a difficult one, having lost her father the day before the event began. This time around was a much better time for Englot. Marie-France Larouche represented Quebec for the second year in a row, making her 7th Scotties appearance with a new team. Andrea Kelly of New Brunswick made her 5th appearance at the Scotties with a new lineup. Kelly recently promoted her third, Rebecca Atkinson, to skip, and Kelly continued to throw fourth stones.

Ontario was represented by the team skipped by Tracy Horgan, who made her first Scotties appearance after stealing the win over Rachel Homan in the Ontario provincial final. Heather Nedohin represented Alberta, marking the first time in twelve years that Nedohin has been to a Scotties. Nedohin is a former Scotties champion under skip Cathy King.

Round robin standings

Results
All times listed in Mountain Time Zone (UTC-7).

Draw 1
Saturday, February 18, 1:00 PM

Draw 2
Saturday, February 18, 6:00 PM

Draw 3
Sunday, February 19, 8:30 AM

Draw 4
Sunday, February 19, 1:30 PM

Draw 5
Sunday, February 19, 6:30 PM

Draw 6
Monday, February 20, 8:30 AM

Draw 7
Monday, February 20, 1:30 PM

Draw 8
Monday, February 20, 7:30 PM

Draw 9
Tuesday, February 21, 8:30 AM

Draw 10
Tuesday, February 21, 1:30 PM

Draw 11
Tuesday, February 21, 7:30 PM

Draw 12
Wednesday, February 22, 8:30 AM

Draw 13
Wednesday, February 22, 1:30 PM

Draw 14
Wednesday, February 22, 7:30 PM

Draw 15
Thursday, February 23, 8:30 AM

Draw 16
Thursday, February 23, 1:30 PM

Draw 17
Thursday, February 23, 7:30 PM

Playoffs

1 vs. 2
Friday, February 24, 7:30 PM

3 vs. 4
Saturday, February 25, 11:00 AM

Semifinal
Saturday, February 25, 4:00 PM

Bronze-medal game
Sunday, February 26, 8:30 AM

Final
Sunday, February 26, 1:30 PM

Top 5 Player percentages

Awards
The awards and all-star teams are as follows:

Sandra Schmirler Most Valuable Player Award
  Heather Nedohin, Alberta

Shot of the Week Award
  Sasha Carter, British Columbia

Marj Mitchell Sportsmanship Award
  Amanda Gates, Ontario

All-Star Teams
First Team
 Skip:  Jennifer Jones, Manitoba
 Third:  Kaitlyn Lawes, Manitoba
 Second:  Jill Officer, Manitoba
 Lead:  Dawn Askin, Manitoba

Second Team
 Skip:  Kelly Scott, British Columbia
 Third:  Beth Iskiw, Alberta
 Second:  Jessica Mair, Alberta
 Lead:  Laine Peters, Alberta

Notes

References

External links

 
Scotties Tournament of Hearts
Sports competitions in Red Deer, Alberta
Curling in Alberta
Scotties Tournament of Hearts
Scotties Tournament of Hearts
Scotties Tournament of Hearts